St Leonards is a semi-rural residential locality in the local government area of Launceston in the Launceston region of Tasmania. It is an eastern suburb of Launceston, with a mix of residential, semi-rural and rural homes. It has schools and shops, and it is a ten-minute drive to the city. It is an alternative to city living. The 2016 census determined a population of 2009 for the state suburb of St Leonards.

History
St Leonards was gazetted as a locality in 1963.

Geography
The North Esk River forms the southern boundary and almost all of the western boundary.

Road infrastructure
The Tasman Highway (A3) passes through a small section of the north-west of the locality, and subsequently also passes through the north-east corner. The C401 route (St Leonards Road) starts at an intersection with A3 in the north-west corner and runs south-east through the locality and town before exiting in the south-west. The C403 route is in two sections within the locality, both starting / ending in the town. The western section (Johnston Road) starts at an intersection with C401 and runs south-west before exiting. The eastern section (Abels Hill Road) starts at an intersection with C401 and runs north-east before ending at an intersection with the A3.

References

Suburbs of Launceston, Tasmania
Localities of City of Launceston
Towns in Tasmania